Grimmicola is a genus of fungi in the family Helotiaceae. This is a monotypic genus, containing the single species Grimmicola parasiticus.

References

External links
Grimmicola at Index Fungorum

Helotiaceae
Monotypic Ascomycota genera
Taxa named by Hannes Hertel